King's Rhapsody is a 1955 British musical film directed by Herbert Wilcox and starring Anna Neagle, Errol Flynn and Patrice Wymore. Wymore was Errol Flynn's wife at the time of filming. It was based on the successful stage musical King's Rhapsody by Ivor Novello.

Plot
Prince Richard of Laurentia is summoned from exile with his mistress Marta (Anna Neagle) in Monte Carlo, to resume Royal duties following the death of his father, the King (Finlay Currie). He is charged to marry Princess Cristiane of Norseland (Patrice Wymore) and produce an heir to the throne. Although Richard's affections are with his mistress, he soon finds his heart warming to his new wife.

Cast
 Anna Neagle as Marta Karillos
 Errol Flynn as Richard, King of Laurentia
 Patrice Wymore as Princess Cristiane 
 Martita Hunt as Queen Mother 
 Finlay Currie as King Paul 
 Francis De Wolff as The Prime Minister 
 Joan Benham as Countess Astrid 
 Reginald Tate as King Peter 
 Miles Malleson as Jules 
 Edmund Hockridge as The Serenader

Production notes
The film was the first of what was meant to be a six-film deal over three years worth £2,500,000. The intention was that Flynn and Neagle would form a team along the lines of Neagle's pairing with Michael Wilding, starting with The White Witch of Rose Hall in Jamaica. However this was the last of the two movies they made together.

Reception
The film was not a success.

Filmink said that "at times King’s Rhapsody feels like an amateur theatre production, with the stars “acting” but with enthusiasm."

In Errol Flynn: The Life and Career, Thomas McNulty noted, "Shot in CinemaScope, the colorful costumes were wonderful to look at but unfortunately the actors wearing those costumes, particularly Flynn, are wooden and unconvincing," and went on to write that he found the film "merely dull," and that "The plot is a disaster disguised as a screenplay"; while Allmovie considered the film "one of the few Neagle/Wilcox failures."

Release
The film underperformed at the box office. A condensed 45-minute version, taken from the film's soundtrack, was broadcast as a BBC Radio play in September 1955.

References

External links

King's Rhapsody at Brit Movie

1955 films
1955 musical films
British musical films
Films directed by Herbert Wilcox
Films shot at Associated British Studios
Operetta films
Films set in Europe
CinemaScope films
1950s English-language films
1950s British films